The 2020–21 Taça de Portugal (also known as Taça de Portugal Placard for sponsorship reasons) was the 81st edition of the Taça de Portugal, the premier knockout competition in Portuguese football.
A total of 165 clubs compete in this edition, including all teams from the top three tiers of the Portuguese football league system – excluding reserve or B teams, which are not eligible – and representatives of the fourth-tier District leagues and cups.
The competition began on 26 September 2020 with the first-round matches involving teams from the third and fourth tiers, and concluded on 23 May 2021 with the final at the Estádio Nacional in Oeiras.

Primeira Liga side Porto were the defending champions and entered the competition in the third round, but they were eliminated by eventual winners Braga in the semi-finals.
Braga beat Benfica 2–0 in the final to win their third title.

Format

Teams 
A total of 165 teams compete in the 2021–21 edition, comprising 18 teams from the Primeira Liga (tier 1), 16 teams from the LigaPro (tier 2), 88 teams from the Campeonato de Portugal (tier 3) and 43 teams from the District championships and cups (tier 4).

Primeira Liga 

 Belenenses SAD
 Benfica
 Boavista
 Braga
 Famalicão
 Farense
 Gil Vicente
 Marítimo
 Moreirense

 Nacional
 Paços de Ferreira
 Porto
 Portimonense
 Rio Ave
 Santa Clara
 Sporting CP
 Tondela
 Vitória de Guimarães

LigaPro 

 Académica
 Académico de Viseu
 Arouca
 Casa Pia
 Chaves
 Cova da Piedade
 Estoril
 Feirense

 Leixões
 Mafra
 Oliveirense
 Penafiel
 Sp. Covilhã
 Varzim
 Vilafranquense
 Vizela

Campeonato de Portugal 

Series A
 Águia Vimioso
 Bragança
 Cerveira
 Maria da Fonte
 Merelinense
 Mirandela
 Montalegre
 Vianense
 Vidago
 Vilaverdense

Series B
 Berço
 Brito
 Camacha
 Desportivo das Aves
 Fafe
 Felgueiras
 Mondinense
 Pevidém
 São Martinho
 Tirsense

Series C
 Amarante
 Câmara de Lobos
 Coimbrões
 Gondomar
 Leça
 Paredes
 Pedras Rubras
 Salgueiros
 Trofense
 União da Madeira
 Vila Real

Series D
 Águeda
 Anadia
 Beira-Mar
 Canelas
 Castro Daire
 Espinho
 Lusitânia Lourosa
 Lusitano Vildemoinhos
 Sanjoanense
 São João de Ver
 Valadares
 Vila Cortez

Series E
 Alcains
 Benfica Castelo Branco
 Carapinheirense
 Condeixa
 GRAP
 Marinhense
 Mortágua
 Oleiros
 Oliveira do Hospital
 Sertanense
 União de Leiria
 Vitória de Sernache

Series F
 1.º de Dezembro
 Alverca
 Caldas
 Fátima
 Loures
 Lourinhanense
 Pêro Pinheiro
 Sacavenense
 Sintrense
 Torreense
 União de Almeirim
 União de Santarém

Series G
 Estrela da Amadora
 Fabril Barreiro
 Fontinhas
 Olímpico Montijo
 Oriental de Lisboa
 Oriental Dragon
 Praiense
 Rabo de Peixe
 Real
 Sporting Ideal

Series H
 Aljustrelense
 Amora
 Esperança de Lagos
 Juventude de Évora
 Louletano
 Lusitano de Évora
 Moncarapachense
 Moura
 Olhanense
 Pinhalnovense
 Vitória de Setúbal

District Championships 

Algarve FA
 Ferreiras (3rd)
 Culatrense (4th)
Angra do Heroísmo FA
 Guadalupe
 Lusitânia dos Açores
Aveiro FA
 Ovarense (2nd)
 Calvão
Beja FA
 Vasco da Gama da Vidigueira (2nd)
 Praia Milfontes (3rd)
Braga FA
 Amares
 Caçadores das Taipas
Bragança FA
 Rebordelo (2nd)
 Estudantes Africanos (3rd)

Castelo Branco FA
 Águias do Moradal (2nd)
 Idanhense (4th)
Coimbra FA
 Tocha (2nd)
 Ançã (3rd)
Évora FA
 União Montemor (2nd)
 Lusitano de Évora
Guarda FA
 Mêda (1st)
 Aguiar da Beira
Horta FA
 Fayal
 Madalena
Leiria FA
 Portomosense (3rd)
 Alqueidão da Serra

Lisbon FA
 Atlético (3rd)
 Ericeirense (4th)
Madeira FA
 Porto da Cruz
Ponta Delgada FA
 São Roque Açores
 Vale Formoso
Portalegre FA
 Crato (1st)
 Portalegrense (2nd)
Porto FA
 Foz
 Vila Meã

Santarém FA
 Fazendense (2nd)
 Tomar
Setúbal FA
 Barreirense (2nd)
 Sesimbra (3rd)
Viana do Castelo FA
 Limianos (2nd)
 Desportivo de Monção
Vila Real FA
 Vilar de Perdizes
 Santa Marta de Penaguião
Viseu FA
 Cinfães (2nd)
 Ferreira das Aves (3rd)

Note: 1st/2nd/3rd/4th: final placing in championship at the time of interruption.

Schedule 
All draws are held at the Portuguese Football Federation (FPF) headquarters in Oeiras. Match kick-off times are in WET (UTC±0) from the third round to the semi-finals, and in WEST (UTC+1) during the rest of the competition. The schedule was published along with all national men competitions on 13 August 2020.

First round 
A total of 131 teams representing the Campeonato de Portugal and the District Championships were involved in the first round draw, which was held on 10 September 2020. Twenty-one teams received a bye to the second round and the remaining teams were split into eight series according to geographical proximity. These teams were then paired inside their series, with the first team drawn playing at home.

Byes
The following twenty-one teams received a bye to the second round:

 Esperança de Lagos (3)
 Merelinense (3)
 Vitória de Setúbal (3)
 Ovarense (4)
 Águeda (3)
 Caldas (3)

 Mortágua (3)
 Fontinhas (3)
 Vidago (3)
 Olímpico Montijo (3)
 Amora (3)

 Vilar de Perdizes (4)
 Desportivo de Monção (4)
 Estudantes Africanos (4)
 Rebordelo (4)
 Salgueiros (3)

 Idanhense (4)
 União de Montemor (4)
 Espinho (3)
 Sesimbra (4)
 Oriental Lisboa (3)

Matches

Second round 
A total of 92 teams were involved in the second round draw, which was held on 10 September 2020.
The 16 teams from the Liga Portugal 2 joined the 55 winners from first round and the 21 teams that received a bye to the second round. All Liga Portugal 2 teams played this round as visitors.

Third round 
A total of 64 teams were involved in the third round draw, which was held on 22 October 2020. The 18 teams from the Primeira Liga joined the 46 winners from second round. All Primeira Liga teams played this round as visitors.

Fourth round 
A total of 32 teams were involved in the fourth round draw, which was held on 25 November 2020.

Fifth round 
A total of 16 teams were involved in the fifth round draw, which was held on 16 December.

Quarter-finals 
The quarter-final pairings were decided during the draw of the fifth round, on 16 December 2020.

Semi-finals 

Times are WET (UTC±0).

Braga won 4–3 on aggregate.

Benfica won 5–1 on aggregate.

Final

Bracket

Notes

References

External links 
 

2020–21
Portugal
2020–21 in Portuguese football